
Gmina Oleśnica is a rural gmina (administrative district) in Oleśnica County, Lower Silesian Voivodeship, in south-western Poland. Its seat is the town of Oleśnica, although the town is not part of the territory of the gmina.

Neighbouring gminas
Gmina Oleśnica is bordered by the town of Oleśnica and the gminas of Bierutów, Czernica, Długołęka, Dobroszyce, Dziadowa Kłoda, Jelcz-Laskowice, Syców and Twardogóra.

Villages
The gmina contains the villages of Bogusławice, Boguszyce, Brzezinka, Bystre, Cieśle, Dąbrowa, Gręboszyce, Jenkowice, Krzeczyn, Ligota Mała, Ligota Polska, Ligota Wielka, Nieciszów, Nowa Ligota, Nowoszyce, Osada Leśna, Ostrowina, Piszkawa, Poniatowice, Smardzów, Smolna, Sokołowice, Spalice, Świerzna, Wszechświęte, Wyszogród, Zarzysko and Zimnica.

References

Olesnica
Oleśnica County